Flesherton (Smithorrs Field) Aerodrome  is located  east northeast of Flesherton, Ontario, Canada.

References

Registered aerodromes in Ontario